Samuel Warren King (May 17, 1852 – August 11, 1922) was a Major League Baseball first baseman who played only one season of professional baseball, with the Washington Nationals.

Professional career

Washington Nationals
He played 12 total games and got eight hits with two doubles and one base on balls. This was his only season in professional baseball.

External links
Career statistics and player information from Baseball-Reference

1852 births
1922 deaths
Major League Baseball first basemen
Baseball players from Massachusetts
Washington Nationals (AA) players
19th-century baseball players